Avi Knafo (born August 4, 1982) is a former Israeli footballer.

Club career
Knafo began his career in the youth team of Beitar Nes Tubruk and joined to the first team of Hapoel Tel Aviv in 2001-02 season.

In 2005, he moved to Hapoel Kfar Saba until January 2009 when he moved to Maccabi Netanya where he failed to be in the starting line-up and so in July he made a move to the newly promoted Hapoel Ra'anana.

International career
Knafo has 7 appearances in the Israel national under-21 football team. His first appearance was on August 15, 2001 against Turkey.

Honours
Toto Cup (1):
2001-02

External links
Stats at ONE

1982 births
Living people
Israeli Jews
Israeli footballers
Beitar Nes Tubruk F.C. players
Hapoel Tel Aviv F.C. players
Hapoel Kfar Saba F.C. players
Maccabi Netanya F.C. players
Hapoel Ra'anana A.F.C. players
Hapoel Acre F.C. players
Israeli Premier League players
Liga Leumit players
Footballers from Netanya
Israeli people of Moroccan-Jewish descent
Association football forwards